Yugoslavia competed at the 1980 Summer Paralympics in Arnhem, Netherlands. 31 competitors from Yugoslavia won 18 medals including 4 gold, 5 silver and 9 bronze and finished 23rd in the medal table.

See also 
 Yugoslavia at the Paralympics
 Yugoslavia at the 1980 Summer Olympics

References 

Yugoslavia at the Paralympics
1980 in Yugoslav sport
Nations at the 1980 Summer Paralympics